Giovane Gomes da Silva (born 20 March 1995) is a Brazilian professional footballer who plays as a forward for Malaysia Super League club Penang.

Club career

Melaka United
On 27 May 2021, Gomes signed a contract with Malaysian club Melaka United. On 25 July 2021, he made his debut for the club in a 1–1 draw against Sri Pahang.

Penang FC
In February 2023, he joined Penang FC. He played as starting centre forward in a pre-season cup match against Selangor FC and won the Hope Cup.

References

External links

1995 births
Living people
Brazilian footballers
Association football forwards
Sociedade Esportiva e Recreativa Caxias do Sul players
Malaysia Super League players
Melaka United F.C. players
Penang F.C. players
Brazilian expatriate footballers
Brazilian expatriate sportspeople in Malaysia
Expatriate footballers in Malaysia